The Battle of Wofla was fought on August 28, 1542 near Lake Ashenge in Wofla (Ofla) between the Portuguese under Cristóvão da Gama and the forces of Imam Ahmad ibn Ibrahim al-Ghazi. Reinforced with a superiority not only in numbers but in firearms, Imam Ahmad was victorious and forced the Portuguese, along with Queen Seble Wongel and her retinue, to flee their fortified encampment and leave their weapons behind.

While fleeing the battlefield with 14 soldiers, Gama, with his arm broken from a bullet, was captured that night by followers of Imam Ahmad, who had been led into the brush they had taken refuge in by an old woman. However other accounts state Gama had stayed behind to look for a woman he had captured at the Battle of the Hill of the Jews with whom he became infatuated. Nonetheless, he was then brought into the presence of the Imam Ahmad, who tortured and executed his captured opponent.

References

Conflicts in 1542
1542 in Africa
1542 in Ethiopia
1542 in the Ottoman Empire
Wofla
Battles involving Portugal
Wofla
Wofla